The discography of Canadian rock band April Wine consists of 16 studio albums, 15 compilation albums and nine live albums. Additionally, they have released 34 singles.

Albums

Studio albums

Compilation albums 

 Greatest Hits (1979)
 Best of April Wine: Rock Ballads (1981)
 Review and Preview (1981)
 The Hits (1987)
 All the Rockers (1987)

 We Like to Rock (1988)
 The First Decade (1989)
 Oowatanite (1990)
 The April Wine Collection (1992)
 Champions of Rock (1996)

 Rock Champions (2000)
 Classic Masters (2002)
 Best of April Wine (2003)
 April Wine Rocks! (2006)
 The Hard & Heavy Collection (2009)

Live albums 

 Live! (1974)
 Live at the El Mocambo (1977)
 Ladies Man EP (1980)

 Monsters of Rock (1980)
 One for the Road (1985)
 Greatest Hits Live (1999)

 I Like to Rock (2002)
 Greatest Hits Live 2003 (2003)
 Live in London (audio CD) (2009)

Singles

Video and DVDs 
 Live in London (live concert video) (1981)
 From the Front Row ... Live! (DVD-Audio) (2003)

See also 
Myles Goodwyn discography

References

External links

Discography
Discographies of Canadian artists
Rock music group discographies